Disaster is a 1948 American drama film directed by William H. Pine and written by Thomas Ahearn. The film stars Richard Denning, Trudy Marshall, Damian O'Flynn, Will Wright, James Millican and Jack Lambert. The film was released on December 3, 1948, by Paramount Pictures.

Plot
Murder suspect James Reid is pursued by Los Angeles police detective Dearborn to a construction site. After avoiding capture, James is hired under an alias by construction boss Pop Hansford, whose daughter Jerry helps run the business. James's skill at construction impresses the bosses, who ask worker Sam Payne to take the new man under his wing. Payne soon becomes jealous over Jerry's obvious romantic attraction to James.

Pop decides to fire James after a scaffolding accident nearly causes Payne's death, but he lends him money and reveals that Detective Dearborn had come around asking questions. James explains how he was falsely accused of his previous construction boss's murder after witnessing a welder, Frosty Davenport, flee the crime scene. Pop places an ad for a welder, hoping Frosty might apply for the job, which he does. An on-site accident leaves Pop pinned beneath a girder. James is able to save him, as well as to force a confession from Frosty and clear his name with the police.

Cast  
Richard Denning as James Reid / Bill Wyatt
Trudy Marshall as Jerry Hansford
Damian O'Flynn as Detective Dearborn
Will Wright as Pop Hansford
James Millican as Sam Payne
Jack Lambert as Frosty Davenport
Jonathan Hale as Police Commissioner Jerome

References

External links 
 
Review of film at Variety

1948 films
American drama films
1948 drama films
Paramount Pictures films
American black-and-white films
Films directed by William H. Pine
1940s English-language films
1940s American films